Haplochromis mylergates is a species of cichlid endemic to Lake Victoria though it may now be extinct.  This species can reach a length of  SL.

References

mylergates
Fish described in 1978
Taxonomy articles created by Polbot